Stenløse Boldklub is an association football club based in the town of Stenløse. The team currently plays in the Zealand Series, the fifth tier of the Danish football league system and the highest tier of the local DBU Zealand.

Stenløse BK's home ground is the 3,000-capacity Stenløse Stadion.

In 2011, the club merged with the neighboring club Ølstykke FC and became SC Egedal. In 2015, Stenløse left the merger and continued under its old name.

References

External links
Official website 

Football clubs in Denmark
Association football clubs established in 1911
1911 establishments in Denmark